Isla Salsipuedes is an island in the Gulf of California off the coast of the Baja California Peninsula. The island is uninhabited and is part of the Mexicali Municipality.

Biology

Isla Salsipuedes has six species of reptiles: Aspidoscelis cana (Isla Salsipuedes whiptail), Crotalus mitchellii (speckled rattlesnake), Hypsiglena ochrorhyncha (coast night snake), Lampropeltis californiae (California kingsnake), Phyllodactylus nocticolus (peninsular leaf-toed gecko), and Uta antiqua (San Lorenzo Islands side-blotched lizard).

References

Islands of Mexicali Municipality
Islands of Baja California
Islands of the Gulf of California
Uninhabited islands of Mexico